Anne Shirley Lucas  (born ) billed also as Annie Lucas,  is a Malaysian-born Australian actress and TV screenwriter and script editor, best known for her roles on television including Bellbird as Glenda Chan,  The Young Doctors from 1977 to 1980 as Eve Turner (Steele) and in Prisoner for two stints in 1982 and 1983 as prison bookie Faye Quinn.

Personal life

Lucas was born in July 1946 in Johor, Malaysia to a father of half Burmese and Irish descent and a mother of half Malay and English descent

She is married to English-Australian Prisoner producer Ian Bradley (born Bath, Somerset, England) They have a son, Lucas ( 1980).

Career

Actress

Early roles include character cameos roles in Skippy (the Bush Kangaroo), Hunter, Homicide, Matlock Police, Division 4 and Spyforce and All Saints

Screenwriter

As well her role as Faye Quinn, she also wrote many episodes of Prisoner, the first season of which was produced by her husband Ian Bradley. Due to her marriage to Bradley, in 1979, it was her idea to open the programme with mugshots of the prisoners, instead of a typical opening title sequence. Lucas also wrote seven episodes of  Prisoner between 1979 and 1983, including episode 327, the fire of Wentworth, which was the first episode of the 1983 season. It is now widely regarded as one of the best episodes of the entire series, and was included on the DVD compilation, Best of Prisoner: Cell Block H Volume 1 (Shock DVD).

She also worked as a Writer on other TV series, including The Flying Doctors and All Saints.

Most recently in her television writing career she worked as a script editor for Channel 7's HeadLand.

Awards and honours 

Lucas was appointed a CBE, in 2005, for her work as a producer in the arts.

Filmography

Screenwriter

Script Editor

References

External links
 

1946 births
Living people
Australian soap opera actresses
Australian television writers
Australian women television writers
Australian women screenwriters
20th-century Australian actresses
21st-century Australian actresses